Badamak (also Romanized as Bādāmak) is a village in Dodangeh-ye Sofla Rural District, Ziaabad District, Takestan County, Qazvin Province, Iran. At the 2006 census, its population was 20, in 4 families.

References 

Populated places in Takestan County